Politically Incorrect is a late-night U.S. political talk show.

Politically Incorrect may also refer to:
 Politically incorrect, someone or something which does not meet a standard of political correctness
 Politically Incorrect (blog), a German political blog
 /pol/ or Politically Incorrect, a discussion board on 4chan and 8chan

See also
Politically Correct (disambiguation)